The Northwest Passage Territorial Park is located at Gjoa Haven, on King William Island, Kitikmeot Region, Nunavut, Canada. The park consists of six areas that show in part the history of the exploration of the Northwest Passage and the first successful passage by Roald Amundsen in the Gjøa.

The park begins at the Nattilik Heritage Centre in Gjoa Haven, which is marked for expansion to include a proper museum, not yet built as of May 2020. The centre contains a replica of the Gjøa and the first salvaged items from the wrecks of Sir John Franklin's ships Erebus and Terror, along with examples of traditional Inuit tools and clothing and a history of the Netsilik Inuit. 

The second site is the former Hudson's Bay Company (HBC) site. This is where the HBC and the Canalaska Trading Company moved to in 1927. The buildings are still in use today by The North West Company.

The third area is Gjoa Haven proper. Amundsen entered "the finest little harbor in the world" on 9 September 1903 and spent two winters there. Along with the observations, he also spent time learning survival skills from the local Inuit, who called the area Uqsuqtuuq (much blubber). 

The fourth is a cairn dedicated to Amundsen, north of the inlet, with a bronze memorial plaque describing his life, his ship and his journey. Amundsen erected here a few temporary buildings, whose only evidence remaining today are some earth mounds. 

The fifth area, on the island's northwestern coast, is a grave site that is believed to be one of the places that members of Sir John Franklin's crew were buried.

There are traces of another shelter that Amundsen used to house his instruments, a marble slab that he used to support his instruments, and a cairn dedicated to Amundsen's teacher George Von Neumayer.

See also
List of Nunavut parks

External links
Nunavut Parks - North West Passage 
North West Passage Territorial Park at Hamlet of Gjoa Haven website

Parks in Kitikmeot Region
Territorial parks of Nunavut
Gjoa Haven